Arseny Grigoryevich Golovko (10 June 1906 – 17 May 1962) was a Soviet admiral, whose naval service extended from the 1920s through the early Cold War.

Service
He entered the Soviet Navy in 1925 and graduated in 1928 from the M.V. Frunze Higher Naval School in Leningrad.  After that he served in various Fleet assignments.  In 1937 and 1938 he took part in the Spanish Civil War on the side of the Republicans.  After his return to the USSR he attended the naval warfare school.  From 1940 to 1946, during the Second World War, he was Commander of the Soviet Northern Fleet.

After the war he held various naval commands, among them Commander of the Baltic Fleet.  In 1956 he was named First Deputy Commander-in-Chief of the Soviet Navy. He died in 1962.

Honours and awards
For his services, Golovko received the Order of Lenin four times and the Order of the Red Banner four times (twice with the Order of Ushakov).  He also was decorated numerous times with other domestic and foreign orders and medals.

 Four Orders of Lenin
 Order of Red Banner, four times
 Order of Ushakov, 1st class, twice
 Order of Nakhimov, 1st class
 Order of the Red Star, twice
 Medal "For the Defence of the Soviet Transarctic"
 Medal "For the Victory over Germany in the Great Patriotic War 1941–1945"
 Jubilee Medal "20 Years of the Workers' and Peasants' Red Army"
 Jubilee Medal "30 Years of the Soviet Army and Navy"
 Jubilee Medal "40 Years of the Armed Forces of the USSR"
 Knight Grand Cross of the Order of St. Olav (1946)

Personal life
His wife was the distinguished Russian actress Kira Golovko. His daughter Natalia Golovko is also an actress.

Commemoration 
The  Soviet cruiser Admiral Golovko took its name from Arseniy Golovko.

References

1906 births
1962 deaths
Burials at Novodevichy Cemetery
Soviet admirals
Recipients of the Order of Lenin
Recipients of the Order of Ushakov, 1st class
Recipients of the Order of Nakhimov, 1st class
Recipients of the Order of the Red Star
Recipients of the Order of the Red Banner
Russian people of the Spanish Civil War
Soviet military personnel of World War II
Soviet people of the Spanish Civil War
Baltic Fleet